Dasturan Rural District is a rural district (dehestan) in the Central District of Joghatai County, Razavi Khorasan Province, Iran. At the 2006 census, its population was 5,473, in 1,430 families.  The rural district has 11 villages.

References 

Rural Districts of Razavi Khorasan Province
Joghatai County